Markus Wormstorm (born Markus Smit; 1981) is a South African electronic musician.

Biography

2000s 
Smit moved to Cape Town in 2001 where he began his career on the city's electronic music circuit.

He graduated from the Pro Arte School of music, art and drama in Pretoria, where he created a number of theatrical writings and won school awards for music and literature. Wormstorm received classical piano training at the age of 12.

After moving to Cape Town, Wormstorm formed collaborations with other musicians. The earliest of these was IDM producer Felix Laband. Together they created 'Killed by Dwarf', a series of experiments spawned from jam sessions which were never released.

In late 2001, Markus was invited by African Dope Records to submit music to their production music libraries. This resulted in a number of minor synchronisation licenses, which Markus quickly spent on hand-making copies of his "album", which he would hand out at gigs and to friends. This brought him to the attention of rapper/composer/protagonist/satirist Waddy Jones, front man of Johannesburg's hip-hop group Max Normal. Later frontman for the band Die Antwoord. When Jones disbanded Max Normal in early 2002, he and long-time DJ partner Sibot invited Markus collaborate on Waddy's The Constructus Corporation project, which resulted in the concept album / graphic novel The Ziggurat (ADOPECD009 African Dope Records 2002).

In January 2003, he along with Felix Laband decided to leave The Constructus Corporation to work on the Real Estate Agents.

Meanwhile, a copy of Wormstorm's "demo" album had found its way into the hands of Alex Threadgold, owner of New York-based electronica / IDM label Sound-Ink, which resulted in a 3-album deal for Markus, alongside stablemates M Sayeed of Anti Pop Consortium and MF Doom. His first album for the label, Rachel the Bear, was released in digital-only format in 2006.

Together with Simon Ringrose (Sibot) and his brother Duncan Ringrose (long-time collaborator and manager of The Constructus Corporation and The Real Estate Agents), he formed the corporate sound design agency 'SAYTHANKYOU', which has won a number of Gold and Silver Loerie Awards for Composition and Sound Design. Markus's works have provided the soundtrack for ad campaigns for the likes of MetroFM (South Africa's biggest urban music radio station), VR Brandy, Audi, Ford, B.O.E., South African Design Indaba, Nokia and local mobile network CellC.

In December 2004, African Dope Records, in association with management label Sshadoworkss, released Markus' self-titled debut South African album, bundled as part of the 3CD pack The Real Estate Agents (ADOPECD012 African Dope Records 2004).

Wormstorm is also writer and music producer for the animation collective The Blackheart Gang, who create short film stories. The group shot their film The Tale of How (2006), which toured with Resfest in 2007 and has won several animation awards including Chanel Plus – France.

In 2006, together with vocalist and long-time collaborator Spoek Mathambo, Wormstorm launched a new collaborative music project called Sweat.X which they describe as "Afro-electro". Subsequent to an intensive networking effort on MySpace, Sweat.X signed a deal with the UK label, Citinite, in March 2007 and toured Europe in June/July 2007.

2010s 
In 2012 Markus created a boutique online music search engine geared towards commercial licensing.

In 2013 he released a 12-track album, "Not, I but A friend". In 2013 Markus founded Honeymoon Studios, which consists of two full service studios based in Cape Town.

In 2014 he starred in the documentary Future Sounds of Mzansi, as was interviewed as one of the pioneers of electronic music in South Africa. In that year he also created an online store aptly called The Wormstore. In that year he also created Honeymoon Podcasts. His studio created three episodes in collaboration with the Arthur C. Clark winning author Lauren Beukes and political analyst, award-winning author and historian Max du Preez. In April 2015 Markus won a Safta Award for Best Achievement in Original Score for his work on the feature film Four Corners.

Later that year he released a self-titled EP under the pseudonym of Akira on his own label Biblo Records for digital download.

Recognition
Markus Wormstorm features in the 2010 South African documentary, The Creators.  In the film, Markus and Sweat.X co-collaborator Spoek tour South Africa's Karoo, making music and exploring the disconnect with the impoverished local community.

Discography
Markus Wormstorm EP (Sound-Ink, June 2004)
Rachel The Bear (Sound-Ink, 2006)
Not I, But A Friend (M=Maximal, 2012)Figure in Field'' (M=Maximal, 2015)

Awards
 2005 Bronze Loerie Advertising Award
 2005 Bronze Craft Clio Award USA
 2006 Special Distinction Award, Annecy International Film Festival France
 2007 Nominated for the Annecy Cristal, Annecy International Film Festival France
 2007 Best Independent Film Award, Bradford International Film Festival
 2007 Canal+ Award, Cleremont-Ferrand Film Festival France
 2007 Excellence Award (Silver), Expose 3
 2007 Grand Master Award (Gold), Expose 4
 2007 Artistic Perfection Prize, International Festival of Animation, St Petersburg, Russia
 2007 Grand Prix of Festival (Golden Peg Bear), Animanima
 2007 Best Video Creation, Curtocircuito International Short Film Festival
 2007 Third Prize, Backup Festival
2007 Festival Internacional de Cortometrajes France
2007 Honorary Mention, Woodstock Film Festival USA 2007 Animated Dreams Grand Prize “Wooden Wolf”, Russia
2014 Loeries Craft Award
2014 Loerie Awards Craft
2015 Safta Award for Best Achievement in Original Score 2015 Loerie Awards Craft Best Music 
2016 Loerie Awards Craft Best Music 
2017 Loerie Awards Craft Best Music 
2017 Shortlist Cannes Lion, France
 2018 Immortal Awards New York nomination USA
 2018 Loerie Award
 2018 CiclopeAfricaAward
 2018 Ciclope Europe Award, Germany
 2019 Ciclope Africa Award selection
 2019 The Lost Botanist Annecy Festival Official VR selection, France
 2019 biblo.tv's Shave to Remember project is shortlisted for a Cannes Award, France
2021 Nomination Best original Music. Cyclope Africa

Notes

References

External links
 Markuswormstorm.tv
 Honeymoon Studios
 Biblo Music Library

South African dance musicians
South African musicians
Living people
1981 births